The 1932 Nebraska gubernatorial election was held on November 8, 1932, and featured incumbent Governor Charles W. Bryan, a Democrat, defeating Republican nominee, newspaper publisher and former state legislator Dwight Griswold, to win a third and final two-year, non-consecutive term in office.

Democratic primary

Candidates
Charles W. Bryan, incumbent Governor
James Franklin Christie
George Walter Olsen
William Ritchie, attorney

Results

Republican primary

Candidates
Dwight Griswold, newspaper publisher and former member of the Nebraska Legislature
Frank Myers
Murray F. Rickard
Robert G. Ross
Kenneth S. Wherry, member of the Nebraska Senate
George A. Williams, former Lieutenant Governor

Results

General election

Results

References

Gubernatorial
1932
Nebraska